Imidazole salicylate is a nonsteroidal anti-inflammatory drug.

References

Nonsteroidal anti-inflammatory drugs
Imidazoles